The Cheese Lane Shot Tower is a grade II listed shot tower in the English city of Bristol. It was built in 1969, and was a replacement for an earlier shot tower, the very first such tower ever built. It now forms part of an office development called Vertigo, and is located on the north bank of the Floating Harbour upstream of Castle Park. There is no public access to the interior of the tower.

History
The original tower was built in 1782, in the Bristol suburb of Redcliffe, by William Watts, who is credited with the invention of the tower process for the manufacture of lead shot. It was the progenitor of many similar towers built around the world, and survived various changes of ownership until it was taken over by the Sheldon Bush and Patent Shot Company Limited in 1868. It continued in use under their ownership until 1968, when it was demolished as part of a road widening scheme.

The current tower was designed as a replacement by E.N. Underwood and Partners, a firm of structural engineers, for the Sheldon Bush and Patent Shot Company Limited. The structure is of reinforced concrete, with a twelve sided crucible room at the top, giving it an outline reminiscent of a cotton bud. It is the last such tower to be built, one of the few to be built in the 20th century, and one of only three to survive in England. It received the Civic Design Award from the Bristol Civic Society for the year 1969.

A lift provided access to the crucible room for both personnel and ingots, along with an emergency staircase. The lead shot fell into a tank of cooling water at the foot of the tower, and were transferred by a conveyor belt to hoppers in the roof of the processing building.

Use of lead shot subsequently declined due to environmental concerns, and the Bliemeister method of shot production largely replaced the use of shot towers for the remaining production. Use of the current tower for its original purpose ceased in the late 1980s, whilst use of the site for manufacturing ceased in 1994. Demolition of the tower was originally proposed, but in 1995 it was scheduled for preservation by English Heritage, with a grade II listing. Plans were made to incorporate the tower as the centrepiece of a new office development, and this came to fruition in 2005 when the tower was incorporated in the new Vertigo office development. It has been fully refurbished, and the upper level is currently used as a board room by the owners.

References

Grade II listed buildings in Bristol
Shot towers
Towers completed in 1969
Towers in Bristol
Listed towers in the United Kingdom